Osama Al Hamadi  (born June 7, 1975 in Libya) is a former Libyan football defender. He was a member of the Libya national football team.

Al Hamadi featured for Libya at the 2009 African Championship of Nations.

References

External links 

Player profile with Photo - Sporting-heroes.net
Player profile - MTN Africa Cup of Nations 2006

1975 births
Living people
Libyan footballers
Association football defenders
Libya international footballers
2006 Africa Cup of Nations players